Zach S. Staenberg, A.C.E. (born August 1951) is an American film editor best known for his work on action films and the Matrix Trilogy. Staenberg won an Academy Award and two ACE Eddie Award for the editing of The Matrix (1999) and for HBO's Gotti (1996) for which he was also nominated for an Emmy. The Matrix films were written and directed by the Wachowskis, with whom Staenberg has had an extended collaboration dating from 1996. He is a frequent collaborator of director Andrew Niccol.

Staenberg has been elected to membership in the American Cinema Editors.

Filmography

Awards and nominations 
 1996 Primetime Emmy Award for Outstanding Single-Camera Picture Editing for a Limited Series or Movie: Gotti (nomination)
 1996 American Cinema Editors for Best Edited Two-Hour Movie for Non-Commercial Television: Gotti (won)
 1999 American Cinema Editors for Best Edited Best Edited Feature Film - Dramatic: The Matrix (won)
 1999 BAFTA Award for Best Editing: The Matrix (nomination)
 1999 Academy Award for Best Film Editing: The Matrix (won)
 2012 The Matrix was listed as the 25th best-edited film of all time in a 2012 survey of members of the Motion Picture Editors Guild.

References

External links 
 van Hook, Andrea (2004). "Zach Staenberg on The Matrix Trilogy", The Editors Guild Magazine Vol. 25, No. 1 (January–February 2005), archived at Webcite from this URL on 2008-05-05.
 

Living people
1951 births
Best Film Editing Academy Award winners
Place of birth missing (living people)
American Cinema Editors
American film editors